Christian Schneuwly (born 7 February 1988) is a Swiss professional footballer who plays as a midfielder for fifth-tier 2. Liga Interregional club Düdingen.

Personal life
His brother Marco is also a footballer. The siblings have played together for Young Boys, Thun and Luzern.

References

External links
 

1988 births
Living people
Association football midfielders
Swiss men's footballers
BSC Young Boys players
FC Biel-Bienne players
FC Thun players
FC Zürich players
FC Luzern players
FC Lausanne-Sport players
FC Stade Lausanne Ouchy players
Swiss Super League players
Swiss Challenge League players
2. Liga Interregional players
Sportspeople from the canton of Fribourg